The 1958–59 Ranji Trophy was the 25th season of the Ranji Trophy. Bombay won the title defeating Bengal in the final. This started a sequence of 15 consecutive Ranji titles for Bombay.

Group stage

West Zone

East Zone

North Zone

South Zone

Central Zone

Knockout stage

Final

Scorecards and averages
Cricketarchive

Notes

References

External links

1959 in Indian cricket
Ranji Trophy seasons